A tenaille (archaic tenalia) is an advanced defensive-work, in front of the main defences of a fortress, which takes its name from resemblance, real or imaginary, to the lip of a pair of pincers. It is "from French, literally: tongs, from Late Latin tenācula, pl of tenaculum".

In a letter to John Bradshaw, President of the Council of State in London, Oliver Cromwell writing from Dublin on 16 September 1649 described one such tenaille that played a significant part during the storming of Drogheda.

Tenaille were a development in fortification formalised by Vauban, among others. A postern gate was placed low down in the curtain wall close to the centre in order to allow the defenders to access the ditches that front the wall. To protect the postern, an outwork, originally V-shaped, was placed in front of the gate, providing an area where the defenders could leave the fortification without being seen or directly shot at.  A simple tenaille is shown in the top image to the right; it is the chevron between the two corner bastions. The design also evolved a version in which the tenaille possesses projections at each end, as seen in the middle image to the right. The name was also used for some other V-shaped parts of outworks; the bottom-most image, a priest's cap, has two tenailles. Also shown is another approach to protect a gate; the roughly triangular outwork seen in the middle of the bottom drawing is a ravelin.

Notes

References

Attribution

Fortification (architectural elements)